Carlina involucrata is a species of perennial herb in the family Asteraceae. They have a self-supporting growth form and broad leaves.

Sources

References 

involucrata
Flora of Malta